The Count  is a text adventure written by Scott Adams and published by Adventure International in 1979. The player character has been sent to defeat the vampire Count Dracula by the local Transylvanian villagers, and must obtain and use items from around the vampire's castle in order to defeat him.

Gameplay
The player moves from location to location, picking up any objects found and using them somewhere else to solve puzzles. The interface is text based; commands took the form of verb and noun, e.g. "Climb Tree". Movement from location to location is limited to North, South, East, West, Up, and Down.

The game differs from earlier Scott Adams adventures due to the use of time. Set over three days, certain problems need to be solved on particular days, and events happen at particular times on certain days. The protagonist also has to avoid being attacked on the first two nights to finish the game.

An earlier Adams game, Voodoo Castle, also featured a Dracula-like character, Count Cristo.

Reception
Bruce Campbell reviewed The Count in The Space Gamer No. 45. Campbell commented that "Unless you are easily frustrated, I highly recommend this program."

Reviews
Computer and Video Games - Jan, 1984

References

External links 
 The Count on The Adventure International Memorial page
 

1970s interactive fiction
1970s horror video games
Interactive fiction based on works
1979 video games
Adventure games
Adventure International games
Apple II games
Atari 8-bit family games
BBC Micro and Acorn Electron games
Commodore 64 games
Commodore PET games
VIC-20 games
Dragon 32 games
TI-99/4A games
TRS-80 games
Video games based on Dracula
Video games developed in the United States
Video games set in castles
ZX Spectrum games
Single-player video games